Sovkhozny is a rural locality (a settlement) and the administrative center of Sovkhozny Selsoviet, Aleysky District, Altai Krai, Russia. The population was 549 as of 2013. There are 8 streets.

Geography 
Sovkhozny is located 16 km south of Aleysk (the district's administrative centre) by road. Alexandrovsky is the nearest rural locality.

References 

Rural localities in Aleysky District